Saint-Remèze is a commune in the Ardèche department in southern France.

Population

See also
 Côtes du Vivarais AOC
Communes of the Ardèche department

References

Communes of Ardèche
Ardèche communes articles needing translation from French Wikipedia